Funny People is a 2009 American comedy-drama film written and directed by Judd Apatow, co-produced by Apatow Productions and Madison 23 Productions, and starring Adam Sandler, Seth Rogen and Leslie Mann with Eric Bana, Jonah Hill and Jason Schwartzman in supporting roles. The film follows a famous comedian who is diagnosed with a terminal disease and tries to fix the relationships in his life while befriending an aspiring comedian.

The film was released on July 31, 2009. It received generally positive reviews with particular praise for the performances but also criticism for its runtime, and grossed $71 million against its $75 million budget. It was the final film produced by Madison 23, as the studio closed down after its release.

Plot
George Simmons is a middle-aged retired stand-up comedian turned movie star. Despite his wealth, he is disillusioned and depressed as most of his recent film work is low-brow and poorly received. Diagnosed with acute myeloid leukemia, he is offered an experimental treatment that has only an 8% success rate. Believing he is about to die, he returns to his roots of stand-up comedy.

Ira Wright is an aspiring stand-up comedian in his 20s, sharing an apartment with his two best friends, Mark and Leo. Mark successfully leads his own TV comedy series. Leo is a rising comedy star and recurring guest star on Mark's TV show.

George meets Ira at a small comedy club, first hiring him as his assistant, Ira becomes one of his only close relationships. Later he becomes his joke writer, opening for him in big comedy clubs, often meeting with real life comedians who talk about the business.

George reconnects with his ex-fiancée, Laura, currently married to Clarke. Once his physician tells him the leukemia is in remission, he decides he wants her back. Laura invites George and Ira to her house in Marin County while her husband is away on business. They spend quality time with her and her two young daughters. George and Laura sneak off to have sex, Clarke returns home and there is an altercation.

Laura faces a choice between her husband Clarke, who she suspects has cheated on her (he later confirms he received a happy ending at a massage parlor), or George (who also cheated on her many times). Ira is not always on George's side in the love triangle, so when it doesn't go George's way in the end, he fires him, who then calls George out on having learned nothing from his near-death experience.

Ira returns to his old food-service job. After some time has passed, George attends Ira's stand-up act and sees that his old assistant has become a talented and competent performer. The next day, George finds Ira at work and they reconnect as friends, telling each other jokes as equals.

Cast

 Adam Sandler as George Simmons, a retired comedian turned actor.
 Seth Rogen as Ira Wright, an aspiring comedian.
 Leslie Mann as Laura, George's ex-fiancée.
 Eric Bana as Clarke, Laura's husband.
 Jonah Hill as Leo Koenig
 Jason Schwartzman as Mark Taylor Jackson
 Aubrey Plaza as Daisy Danby
 Maude Apatow as Mable
 Iris Apatow as Ingrid
 Aziz Ansari as Randy Springs
 RZA as Chuck
 Torsten Voges as Dr. Lars
 Allan Wasserman as Dr. Stevens
 Wayne Federman as Comedy & Magic Manager
 Mike O'Connell as MySpace Escort
 Nicole Parker as Dawn
 Nydia McFadden as Mandy
 Nicol Paone as George's Sister
 George Coe as George's Dad
 Bryan Batt as George's Agent
 Maggie Siff as Rachel
 Tonita Castro as Bonita
 

Comedians Orny Adams, Dave Attell, Andy Dick, Charles Fleischer, Budd Friedman, Monty Hoffman, Carol Leifer, Al Lubel, Norm Macdonald, Rod Man, Jerry Minor, Paul Reiser, Ray Romano, Mark Schiff, Sarah Silverman, and George Wallace had cameos as themselves in the roles of George's fellow comedians, while comedians Tyler Spindel and Kyle Kinane respectively played a college guy with a camera and a paparazzo at the medical center. Rapper Eminem, musician James Taylor, and Myspace founder Tom Anderson also briefly appeared as themselves. Musicians Jon Brion, James Gadson, and Sebastian Steinberg appeared in the film as members of George's jam band. Actress Carla Gallo and comedian Bo Burnham appeared as characters on Yo Teach!, the television show within the film which stars Mark, while Justin Long and Apatow regular Ken Jeong had cameos as characters in the movies for which George is famous. In the film, the posters for George's films also featured actors Owen Wilson and Elizabeth Banks on them. Actors Steve Bannos and Elaine Kao had small roles respectively as a deli manager and a mom with a camera.

Production
Judd Apatow had expressed his desire to make a stand-up comedian mentor film loosely based on his own early experiences as a struggling performer. He could not come up with an interesting idea, however, since most of his mentors were kind to him. He then thought of making a film about a mentor facing a life crisis, and decided to cast his former roommate Adam Sandler after seeing him in Reign Over Me. They discussed making the film almost two years prior to production.

Apatow had cast Sandler, Seth Rogen, and Leslie Mann as the three leads in March 2008. Eric Bana, Jonah Hill, and Jason Schwartzman were cast in June 2008 when the title of the film was announced. When asked about the decision to cast Bana, Apatow said that both he and Rogen are fans of his films; Rogen additionally commented they cast him as the husband because he was someone who would be considered an intimidating presence to both Sandler and Rogen. Bana mentioned that he decided to play the character with his native Australian accent so he would be more comfortable improvising. Apatow and Mann's daughters, Maude and Iris Apatow, play the young girls in the film. Both Apatow and Mann state that this casting choice allowed for more natural dialogue for the children, but the girls have not been allowed to actually see the film.

Academy Award-winning cinematographer Janusz Kamiński handled the cinematography for the film. Apatow had Sandler, Rogen, and Hill write their own material for routines. Apatow filmed them performing their routines in front of live audiences, using six cameras to capture their performances and audience reactions. Apatow filmed their entire performances, although only five to ten minutes of stand-up footage appear in the film. Hill admitted his performance was not well-received because he had never done stand-up before. Additionally, Apatow filmed scenes from Sandler's character's fictional filmography, as well as scenes from Schwartzman's character's fictional television show Yo Teach!, for the film to add realism.

Apatow used an old video of Sandler, from when the two were roommates, in which Sandler makes prank phone calls, and features a young Ben Stiller and Janeane Garofalo.

Marketing
The first teaser poster for the film was released November 13, 2008. That same day, Universal Pictures and MySpace partnered together to launch a contest that would allow people to have a part in the film by just writing a comment explaining why. Additionally, Apatow held a stand-up comedy concert event called "A Night of Funny People" at the Orpheum Theater in Los Angeles to film a scene for the movie. The event was open to the general public and featured acts by Adam Sandler, Seth Rogen, Aziz Ansari, Sarah Silverman, David Spade, and Patton Oswalt, with Sandler, Rogen, and Ansari performing as their characters in the film. The first theatrical trailer for the film was released February 20, 2009 on the Internet, with a shortened version first appearing in theaters with I Love You, Man.

A website for a fictional television show-within-a-film was created on NBC.com. The sitcom, Yo Teach!, "stars" character Mark Taylor Jackson (Jason Schwartzman), a C-list actor portraying a young teacher with a class of failing students, and includes a cameo by internet celebrity Bo Burnham.

A website for Aziz Ansari's character Randy Springs was created, along with a documentary of the character on FunnyOrDie.com. The documentary was directed by Jason Woliner.

Comedy Central aired a special, "Inside Funny People" on July 20, documenting the making of the film and showing clips of the stand-up. On July 24, the channel also aired "Funny People: Live, a live broadcast stand-up of Sandler, Rogen and Hill as part of the film's promotion.

Release
Funny People premiered on July 20, 2009, in Los Angeles, California. It was released in all territories by Universal Pictures.

Home media
Funny People was released on DVD and Blu-ray in the United States on November 24, 2009. There is a one-disc "Unrated & Theatrical" cut and a two-disc "Unrated Edition". The Unrated cut of the film runs at 153 minutes. It was released in the United Kingdom on January 18, 2010.

Reception

Box office
Funny People grossed $51.9 million in the United States and Canada and $19.7 million in other territories for a worldwide total of $71.6 million, against a production budget of $75 million. 

In North America the film was released on July 31, 2009 in 3,007 theaters. It grossed $8.6 million on its opening day and $22.7 million in its opening weekend, finishing first at the box office.

Critical response
On Rotten Tomatoes, Funny People holds an approval rating of 69% based on 236 reviews and an average rating of 6.4/10. The site's critical consensus reads, "Funny People features the requisite humor, as well as considerable emotional depth, resulting in Judd Apatow's most mature film to date." Another review aggregator, Metacritic, gave the film a score of 60 out of 100, based on 36 critics, indicating "mixed or average reviews". Audiences polled by CinemaScore gave the film an average grade of "B−" on an A+ to F scale.

Roger Ebert of the Chicago Sun-Times awarded the film three and a half of four stars, calling it "a real movie. That means carefully written dialogue and carefully placed supporting performances — and it's about something. It could have easily been a formula film...but George Simmons learns and changes during his ordeal, and we empathize." It is the highest rating Ebert ever gave an Adam Sandler film, tied with his review for Punch-Drunk Love. Peter Travers of Rolling Stone also praised the film, writing, "Apatow scores by crafting the film equivalent of a stand-up routine that encompasses the joy, pain, anger, loneliness and aching doubt that go into making an audience laugh." Kyle Smith of the New York Post wrote that the film was "one of the most absorbing films of the year."

Michael Phillips of the Chicago Tribune gave the film one of its mixed reviews, complaining of the film's two-and-a-half-hour running time: "Funny People is...an attempt by Apatow to reconcile the huge success he has become with the up-and-comer he once was. The results run an increasingly exasperating 2½ hours.".

Manohla Dargis of The New York Times complains the film is "irritatingly self-satisfied" and describes the film as "nice" ... "but nice can be murder on comedy and drama alike".

Gene Shalit of NBC's The Today Show stated that it's "a smirk of faithful characters that are making a vanity movie about themselves that keeps not ending for 2 1/2 unendurable hours. Director Judd Apatow wrote the script and it's vulgar, in fact it's ineffable, because without the letter F, he would have no script."

Soundtrack

Funny People: Original Motion Picture Soundtrack was released on July 28, 2009.
 "Great Day" by Paul McCartney (2:08)
 "Wires" by Coconut Records (2:26)
 "All the King's Horses" by Robert Plant and the Strange Sensation (4:19)
 "Carolina in My Mind" (Live) by James Taylor (4:58)
 "Keep Me in Your Heart" by Warren Zevon (3:27)
 "Real Love" by John Lennon performed by Adam Sandler (4:56)
 "We (Early Take)" by Neil Diamond (4:11)
 "Jesus, Etc." (Live Summer '08) by Wilco feat. Andrew Bird (4:01)
 "George Simmons Soon Will Be Gone" by Adam Sandler (2:15)
 "I Am Young" by Coconut Records (3:07)
 "Memory" by Maude Apatow & Larry Goldings (3:53)
 "Numb as a Statue" by Warren Zevon (4:07)
 "Photograph" by Ringo Starr (3:58)
 "Watching the Wheels" (Acoustic Demo) by John Lennon (3:06)

Bonus tracks on iTunes release:
  "Secret O' Life (Live)" by James Taylor (3:55)
 "Photograph" (Live) by Adam Sandler (2:55)
 "Everybody Knows This Is Nowhere" by Adam Sandler (4:02)
 "Nighttiming" by Coconut Records (2:48)

The film also features "Joanna" by Kool & The Gang, "Three Little Birds" by Bob Marley, "Diamond Dave" by The Bird and the Bee, "Man in the Box" by Alice in Chains, "(I've Had) The Time of My Life" by Bill Medley & Jennifer Warnes, "Walk Like an Egyptian" by The Bangles, "In Private" by Paul McCartney, "Cat Song" by Tomoko Kataoka and "Give Me Love (Give Me Peace on Earth)" by George Harrison. Songs from all four former members of The Beatles are in the film and on its soundtrack.

The Blu-ray and 2-Disc DVD includes a jam session of Sandler and Jon Brion performing "Real Love", "Photograph" and a previously unreleased cover of The English Beat's "Save It for Later." (The band's original 1982 version of the song is used in the movie.)

Additional songs used in the film's trailers are "We Will Become Silhouettes" by The Postal Service, "My Friend" by Dr. Dog, and "Nothing'severgonnastandinmyway (Again)" by Wilco.

See also

List of films featuring fictional films

References

External links

 
 
 
 
 

2009 comedy-drama films
2009 films
2000s buddy comedy-drama films
American buddy comedy-drama films
American comedy-drama films
Apatow Productions films
Columbia Pictures films
2000s English-language films
Films scored by Michael Andrews
Films about cancer
Films about comedians
Films directed by Judd Apatow
Films produced by Judd Apatow
Films produced by Barry Mendel
Films produced by Clayton Townsend
Films set in Los Angeles
Films set in San Francisco
Films set in the San Francisco Bay Area
Films shot in Los Angeles
Films shot in San Francisco
Happy Madison Productions films
Relativity Media films
Films with screenplays by Judd Apatow
Universal Pictures films
2000s American films
English-language comedy-drama films